Karaikandeswarar Temple, Kanji is a Tamil Hindu temple dedicated to the deity Shiva, located in Kanji village near the town of Thiruvannamalai in Tamil Nadu, India. Karaikandeswarar Temple, is the first Karaikandeswarar (shiva) temple among seven (saptha) temples all these temples are located on the banks of Cheyyar River in different places. The temple was Constructed in the Dravidian style of architecture. In this temple Shiva is worshiped as Karaikandeswarar, and is represented by the lingam. His consort Parvati is depicted as Periyanayagi Amman. The temple has four daily rituals at various times from 6:00 a.m. to 9:00 p.m. The Panguni uthiram festival is celebrated during month of Panguni  on the day the moon transits in the asterism or nakshatram of Uttara-phalguni or Uthiram in the twelfth month of the Tamil solar calendar i.e. Panguni (March–April). It is the full moon of the month of Panguni (Tamil month).The present masonry structure was built by Se.Ve.Venketaraman chettiyar.

Religious Practices
The temple priests perform the pooja (rituals) during festivals and on a daily basis. Like other Shiva temples of Tamil Nadu, the priests belong to the Shaivaite community, a Brahmin sub-caste. The temple rituals are performed four times a day; Ushathkalam at 5:30 a.m., Kalasanthi at 8:00 a.m., Uchikalam at 10:00 a.m., Sayarakshai at 6:00 p.m., and Ardha Jamam at 10:00 p.m. Each ritual comprises four steps: abhisheka (sacred bath), alangaram (decoration), neivethanam (food offering) and deepa aradanai (waving of lamps) for both Karaikandeswarar and Periyanayagi Amman.

Festivals
The temple celebrates dozens of festivals throughout the year. The most important of these is the Panguni uthiram (or Phalguni in devanagari) Brahmotsavam that lasts ten days during the Tamil month of Panguni, between March and April, concluding with the celebration of Kalyanotsavam. In Brahmotsavam, the idols of Karaikandeswarar and Periyanagi are decorated with clothes and jewels, are mounted on a vahana, and then taken around the maadha veeti (streets) in a pradakshinam (a clockwise path when seen from above). This is repeated with different vahanas over the next nine days. The more important of the individual pradakshinams are the Athigara Nandhi on the first day, the Rishaba Vahanam on the midnight of the fifth day, and the Natarajar festival on the Ninth day.

Tiruvoodal is another festival celebrated during the first week of the Tamil month Thai at mid-January of every year. On the morning of Maatu Pongal, between 15 and 16 January, Nandi is decorated with garlands made of fruits, vegetables and sweets.  The festival deities of Karaikandeswarar and Periyanayagi Amman are taken out of the temple to Tiruoodal street to enact the oodal (or love tiff) between the two in the evening.

References

Hindu temples in Tiruvannamalai district